Uncharacterized protein KIAA0895-like also known as LOC653319, is a protein that in humans is encoded by the KIAA0895L gene.

Gene 

KIAA0895L is located at q22.1 on chromosome 16 of the human genome.  Its genomic DNA consists of 8,379 base pairs.  KIAA0895L is located between EXOC3L and E2F4 on the right, and NOL3 and HSF4 on the left. The promoter for KIAA0895L is located on chromosome 16 and spans 67217367-67218383bp.

KIAA0895L was first documented by the Mammalian Gene Collection Program Team in 2002.  There are several patents on KIAA0895L, two of those being patent US 6943241 and patent EP1308459.

Species distribution 

 

KIAA0895L orthologs can be found in all mammals. It is not found in plants, archaea, or fungi.    KIAA0895L has a single paralog, known as KIAA0895.

The known orthologs of KIAA0895L are listed below:

Chimpanzee – LOC741288
Rhesus monkey – LOC696623
Dog – LOC489765
Horse – LOC100053028
Giant panda – PANDA_006923
Cow – LOC512420
Norway rat – LOC688736
Zebra finch – LOC100223241
Chicken – LOC415660
Mouse – LOC74356
Opossum – LOC100019983
Puffer fish – Unnamed
Sea squirt – LOC100177006
Platypus – LOC100078127
Zebrafish – LOC562097
Frog – LOC100135412
Sea urchin – KIAA0895
Ciliated protozoa – TTherm_01042050
Plasmodium – PY05482
Trichoplax adherens – TRIADDRAFT_62861
Kordia – KAOT1_03617

Structure 

KIAA0895L is composed of 471 amino acids (53.5kDa).   A proline-rich region was also revealed at 14-65 amino acids.  There is also an area of low complexity at 2913-2917 bp in the 3’ UTR region.  There is a conserved domain of unknown function, known as DUF1704, located at 1390-2083 bp.

Predicted post translational modifications 

The following is a list of predicted post translational modifications found for KIAA0895L. These are predicted in all mammalian orthologs in the public sequence database.

Interacting proteins 

No proteins that interact with KIAA0895L or its homolog have yet been identified.

Tissue distribution 

KIAA0895L is expressed in many tissues of the body such as brain, testis, mammary glands, bladder, and the eye.

Clinical significance 

KIAA0895L has been shown to be up regulated in lymphoblastoid cells from males with autism that is caused by an expansion of a CGG repeat in the promoter region of the fragile X mental retardation 1 gene located at Xq27.3 as well as in cells with a 15q11-q13 mutation.

Notes and references 

Human proteins